There are 20 Grade I listed war memorials in England, out of over 3,000 listed war memorials. In the United Kingdom, a listed building is a building or structure of special historical or architectural importance; listing offers the building legal protection against demolition or modification, which requires permission from the local planning authority. Listed buildings are divided into three categories—grade I, grade II*, and grade II—which reflect the relative significance of the structure and may be a factor in planning decisions. Grade II accounts for 92% of listed buildings, while grade II* is an intermediate grade accounting for 5.5%; grade I holds the remaining 2.5% of listed buildings and is reserved for structures of exceptional significance. Grade I listed war memorials are deliberately very few, though several have been upgraded to grade I status as part of commemorations around the First World War centenary. A war memorial listed at grade I will be of exceptional interest for its design and artistic merit and will be of great historical interest. Such memorials are often the work of famous architects or sculptors, amongst the most prolific of whom was Sir Edwin Lutyens, whose memorials account for a third of all those listed at grade I. Lutyens designed dozens of war memorials across the United Kingdom and elsewhere in the Commonwealth, including the Cenotaph in London—the focus for the national Remembrance Sunday services—and the Arch of Remembrance in Leicester—the largest of Lutyens' war memorials in Britain; both are listed at grade I. As part of the commemorations of the centenary of the First World War, Historic England—the government body responsible for listing in England—is running a project with the aim of significantly increasing the number of war memorials on the National Heritage List for England.

This list includes only memorials that are grade I listed buildings in their own right. Memorials which are not free-standing—such as a plaque on a church wall—or which form part of the curtilage of a listed building—such as a sculpture within a building—but do not have their own entry on the National Heritage List for England are not included. For example, this list does not include the grade I listed Hall of Memory, Birmingham or Winchester College War Cloister.

War memorials in England take a wide variety of forms and commemorate centuries of conflicts, though memorials to conflicts and the soldiers who fought in them—rather than exclusively commemorating victorious commanders—only started to be commonplace after the Battle of Waterloo in 1815, which ended the Napoleonic Wars. The aftermath of the First World War (1914–1918) produced significantly more memorials than any other single conflict; thus this list is dominated by First World War memorials, many of which were later re-dedicated or added to reflect losses from the Second World War (1939–1945). Unusually, Southampton Cenotaph was rededicated to the dead from multiple conflicts later in the 20th century.

Memorials

See also

Grade II* listed war memorials in England

Notes

References

 
World War II memorials in England
 War memorials
Grade I listed monuments and memorials